This is a list of cities and towns in North America that have, or once had, town tramway (urban tramway, or streetcar) systems as part of their public transport system. The use of the diamond (♦) symbol indicates where there were (or are) two or more independent tram systems operating concurrently within a single metropolitan area. Separate lists exist for the United States, Canada, and Mexico.

Aruba

Barbados

Canada

Cuba

Curaçao (to the Netherlands)

Dominican Republic

Haiti

Jamaica

Martinique (to France)

Mexico

Puerto Rico (to U.S.)

United States

See also
 List of town tramway systems in Africa
 List of town tramway systems in Asia
 List of town tramway systems in Central America
 List of town tramway systems in Europe
 List of town tramway systems in Oceania
 List of town tramway systems in South America
 List of town tramway systems
 List of tram and light rail transit systems
 List of metro systems
 List of trolleybus systems

References

Tram transport-related lists
Tram
Streetcars in North America